Dalwal is a village and union council, an administrative subdivision, of Chakwal District in the Punjab Province of Pakistan, it is part of Choa Saidan Shah Tehsil and is located at 32°42'0N 72°52'60E

Its very old village which is linked with Raja Daulta Khan. The majority of the population are Janjua, Rajputs, Awan. with a minority of Minhas. Bhatti

Dalwal is predominantly Muslim with small Christian minority.

The Mission High School was established in 1900 by Christian. It was the only one in Chakwal District before the independence of Pakistan, started by Franciscan priests. It was nationalized 1972 and in 2000 it was denationalized and given back to the Catholics.

References

Union councils of Chakwal District
Populated places in Chakwal District